first opened in Toyama, Toyama Prefecture, Japan in 1979 as the . The Museum reopened in its current guise after renewal in 2007. The museum collects, preserves, researches, and displays materials relating to the natural history of the area and there is also a planetarium.

Publications
  (1979—)

See also
 Museum of Modern Art, Toyama
 Botanic Gardens of Toyama
 Toyama Castle

References

External links
  Toyama Science Museum
  Bulletin of the Toyama Science Museum

Toyama (city)
Museums in Toyama Prefecture
Museums established in 1979
1979 establishments in Japan
Natural history museums in Japan